Daojiao is a town under the jurisdiction of Dongguan prefecture-level city in the Pearl River Delta region of Guangdong province, China.

Transportation

 Daojiao will host two Dongguan Rail Transit stations under the current plans for construction of Line 1:

 Daojiao
 Daojiaodong (Dajiao East)

Geography of Dongguan
Towns in Guangdong